Super Juniors are a group of fictional DC Comics characters based on members of the Justice League of America, designed as baby versions in order to appeal to younger audiences and introduce them to the publisher's most popular properties. At Kenner's request, first appeared in José Luis García-López's 1982 DC Comics Style Guide and had their first and only adventure in Super Jrs. Holiday Special: The Best of DC Blue Ribbon Digest #58 (March 1985) in a story written by Tom DeFalco and drawn by Vince Squeglia. There was a considerable amount of merchandise (toys, wallpapers, bed sheets and covers, furniture, flash cards, coloring books, etc.) based on them.

Characters include "Jr." versions of Superman (Super-Kid, Casey), Batman (Bat-Guy, Carlos) and Robin (Kid-Robin, the Shrimp), Wonder Woman (Wonder Tot, Deedee), Flash (Flash-Kid, Rembrandt), Green Arrow, Green Lantern, Hawkman, Aquaman and, later, Supergirl. In the Holiday Special, they are orphan youngsters from the Miss Piffle's Nursery School, transformed by the fairy spirit of Christmas into superheroes to stop the evil Wallace van Whealthy III, the Weather Wizard, a school bully super villain and rescue Santa Claus.

Wonder Tot 
In Wonder Woman #105 (April 1959), Wonder Tot was introduced as Wonder Woman during her younger years. Through magic, the child was able to co-exist alongside her older self without any ramifications. Befriending Mister Genie (Genro), she would return infrequently over the years that followed in her own adventures.

The Girl Superbaby 
In Action Comics #260 (January 1960), Supergirl is reduced in age when she comes into contact with a pool of water upon saving an old man.

The Babe of Steel 
In several instances, Superman has been reduced to a youthful version of himself. In Action Comics #284 (January 1962), he purposely exposes himself to Red Kryptonite towards this effect to enter a small gap into the Phantom Zone. In the Super Friends: The Legendary Super Powers Show episode "Uncle Mxyzptlk" (1984), Superman is again exposed to Red Kryptonite and is de-aged, referred by his teammates as "Super Brat". For Superman/Batman #46, Silver Kryptonite made Superman act like a childish version of himself and observed those around him as children.
Beginning in Superboy #8 (May 1950), the adventures of Superman during his youngest years were infrequently depicted with the hero identified as Superbaby.
For DC Nation Shorts, スーパーマン @ Tokyo features a baby given Superman's powers upon wearing his cape as a diaper.

Bat-Baby 
In Batman #147 (May 1962), a scientist transforms Batman's body into that of a four-year-old. In the Batman: The Brave and the Bold episode "The Malicious Mr. Mind!" (2011), Doctor Sivana uses a ray on Batman that sees him regress in age.

In Mad #8 (December 1953-January 1954), Batman is parodied as a little person named Bat Boy with sidekick Rubin (in place of Robin). This story would later be adapted for the Batman: The Brave and the Bold episode "Bat-Mite Presents: Batman's Strangest Cases!" (2011).

For DC Nation Shorts, Aardman Animations produced Batman shorts featuring a juvenile Batman and a likewise treatment of his cast of characters.

Superboy, Batboy, and Kid Flash 
In Action Comics #466 (December 1976), Lex Luthor transforms Superman, Batman, and the Flash to juvenile versions of themselves.

Sins of Youth 
During the events of Young Justice: Sins of Youth (2000), the Justice League, Justice Society of America, and several other adults are transformed into juvenile versions of themselves by Klarion the Witch Boy. These events would lead to the character Li'l Lobo to join Young Justice. The storyline was very loosely adapted by the Justice League television series in the episode "Kid Stuff" but rather than The Demon character Klarion transforming the League into younger versions of themselves, it was The Demon'''s Morgaine le Fey's son Mordred.

 Lil' Leaguers 
In the Superman/Batman arc "Lil' Leaguers", a juvenile Justice League from a parallel world is introduced including Superman, Batman, Wonder Woman, Green Lantern, Flash, Red Arrow, Red Tornado, Supergirl, Vixen, Black Lightning, Zatanna, and Black Canary. Lil' villains from their world also appear in Lex Luthor, Joker, Doomsday, Catwoman, Two-Face, Cyborg Superman, Brainiac, Bizarro, Poison Ivy, Hush, Clayface, Killer Croc, and Mister Freeze. 2012's "The Curse of Superman" in Action Comics #9 formally introduced Earth 42, home to the Little League featuring juvenile versions of Aquaman, Batman, Cyborg, Green Arrow, Hawkman, Martian Manhunter, Steel, Superman, and Wonder Woman. The series Batman: Li'l Gotham was based on this Earth.

 Secret Hero Society 
Publisher Scholastic produces a series of children's books under the banner "Secret Hero Society" featuring DC Comic characters as youths coming together into their costumed personas as children.

 Legion of Super-Babies 
In Adventure Comics #338 (November 1965), the Time Trapper transformed several members of the Legion of Super-Heroes into youthful versions of themselves. These members included Saturn Girl, Chameleon Boy, Element Lad, Invisible Kid, Light Lass, Matter-Eater Lad, Star Boy, and Ultra Boy. Earlier in the series, various Legion members had been similarly reduced temporarily to babyhood in Adventure'' #317 ("The Menace of Dream Girl") and later, in #356 the concept was re-introduced with "Superbaby, Element Infant, Dream Tot, Little Mon-El and Baby Braniac" cover-featured in the story "The Five Legion Orphans".

See also 
 Super Powers Collection
 JL8
 Tiny Titans
 X-Babies

References

Justice League
DC Comics child superheroes
DC Comics superhero teams